{{Infobox legislative term|name=13th Maharashtra Assembly|chamber2_leader6_type=Leader of the Opposition|chamber2_leader2_type=Duputy Speaker of the House|chamber2_leader2=Vijayrao Bhaskarrao Auti(Shiv Sena)|chamber2_leader3_type=Chief Minister|chamber2_leader3=Devendra Fadnavis|chamber2_leader5_type=Leader of the House|chamber2_leader5=Devendra Fadnavis|chamber2_leader6=Vijay Namdevrao Wadettiwar(INC)|chamber2_leader1_type=Speaker of the House|chamber1=Sovereign|chamber1_image=|chamber1_image_size=|chamber1_alt=|membership1=|control1=|chamber1_leader1_type=Governor|chamber2_leader1=Haribhau Bagade(BJP)|control2=National Democratic Alliance
|government=First Fadnavis ministry
|before=12th Assembly
|after=14th Assembly|image=Vidhan Bhavan aerial view.jpg|image_size=250px|caption=Maharashtra Vidhan Sabha Mumbai|body=Maharashtra Legislature|election=2014 Maharashtra Legislative Assembly election|opposition=|membership2=288|term_start=15 October 2014|term_end=|website=|chamber2=House of the People|chamber2_image=2014 Maharashtra Vidhan Sabha.svg|chamber2_image_size=350px|chamber2_alt=|chamber1_leader1=*C. Vidyasagar RaoBhagat Singh Koshyari}}The Members of 13th Legislative Assembly of Maharashtra''' were elected during the 2014 Maharashtra Legislative Assembly election, with results announced on 19 October 2014.

The Bharatiya Janata Party was elected as the largest party in the election with 122 seats out of 288 seats, 76 more than their previous 46 seats. The Shiv Sena was elected as the second largest party in the election with 63 seats out of 288 seats, 18 more than their previous 45 seats. Devendra Fadnavis took oath as the Chief minister of Maharashtra with outside support from the Nationalist Congress Party in the beginning and then Shiv Sena direct support after 1 month.

Members

Party-wise Seats

Members of Legislative Assembly

References 

 
Maharashtra Legislature